Dan "Danny" Fletcher (born 4 March 1997) is an English footballer who plays as a forward.

Career
Fletcher joined Mansfield Town's youth setup in 2013, after starting it out at Teversal. He was promoted to the main squad in December 2014, signing an 18-month professional deal.

Fletcher made his professional debut on 16 December, coming on as a late substitute in a 0–1 FA Cup home loss against Cambridge United. On 29 January 2016, after only two senior appearances, he was released.

References

External links

1997 births
Living people
English footballers
Association football forwards
Mansfield Town F.C. players
Carlton Town F.C. players
Heanor Town F.C. players
English Football League players